Sir Theodore Wilson Harris (24 March 1921 – 8 March 2018) was a Guyanese writer. He initially wrote poetry, but subsequently became a novelist and essayist. His writing style is often said to be abstract and densely metaphorical, and his subject matter wide-ranging. Harris is considered one of the most original and innovative voices in postwar literature in English.

Biography 
Wilson Harris was born in New Amsterdam in British Guiana, where his father worked at an insurance company. 
His parents were Theodore Wilson Harris and Millicent Josephine Glasford Harris. After studying at Queen's College in the capital of Guyana, Georgetown, he became a government surveyor, before taking up a career as lecturer and writer. The knowledge of the savannas and rain forests he gained during his twenty years as a land surveyor formed the setting for many of his books, with the Guyanese landscape dominating his fiction. The experience of the Guyanese interior also shaped his approach to fiction. He writes: "The impact of the forests and savannahs on those expeditions was to become of profound value in the language of the fictions I later wrote. My stepfather's disappearance in that immense interior when I was a child was the beginning of an involvement with the enigma of quests and journeys through visible into invisible worlds that become themselves slowly visible to require to require further penetration into other visible worlds without end or finality" (“An Autobiographical Essay,” in Adler 2003: ix–x).

Between 1945 and 1961, Harris was a regular contributor of stories, poems and essays to Kyk-over-Al literary magazine and was part of a group of Guyanese intellectuals that included Martin Carter, Sidney Singh, Milton Williams, Jan Carew, and Ivan Van Sertima. Harris later privately printed his poetic contributions to the magazine in the collection Eternity to Season (1954). Harris married his first wife Cecily Carew in 1945 (sister of famed Guyanese novelist Jan Carew). They had four children; the marriage dissolved around 1957.

Harris moved to England in 1959. That year, he met and married his second wife, Scottish poet and playwright Margaret Whitaker. They remained married for fifty years until she died in 2010. They never had children.

Harris published his first novel Palace of the Peacock in 1960 with Faber, approved for publication by then-editor in chief, T. S. Eliot. This became the first of a quartet of novels, The Guyana Quartet, which includes The Far Journey of Oudin (1961), The Whole Armour (1962), and The Secret Ladder (1963). He subsequently wrote the Carnival trilogy: Carnival (1985), The Infinite Rehearsal (1987), and The Four Banks of the River of Space (1990).

His most recent novels were Jonestown (1996), which tells of the mass-suicide of followers of cult leader Jim Jones, The Dark Jester (2001), a semi-autobiographical novel, The Mask of the Beggar (2003), and The Ghost of Memory (2006).

Harris also wrote non-fiction and critical essays and was awarded honorary doctorates by the University of the West Indies (1984) and the University of Liège (2001). He twice won the Guyana Prize for Literature.

Harris was created a Knight Bachelor in June 2010, in the Queen Elizabeth II Birthday Honours. In 2014, Harris won a Lifetime Achievement Prize from the Anisfield-Wolf Book Awards.

Criticism
Louis Chude-Sokei argues that the readerly "consensus is that Harris's irrecuperability and his minor or cult status is largely due to his prose... its complexity and density, whether fiction or non-fiction, regularly ban him from course syllabi and the rituals of literary culture, even in the Caribbean." At the same time, perhaps partly because of the challenge of Harris' work, "his legacy can and should make a difference" to Caribbean art and thought (ibid). Harris has been admired for his exploration of the themes of conquest and colonization as well as the struggles of colonized peoples. Readers have commented that his novels are an attempt to express truths about the way people experience reality through the lens of the imagination. Harris has been faulted for his novels that have often nonlinear plot lines, and for his preference of internal perceptions over external realities. In Palace of the Peacock (1960), a character who may be depicted as dying in one scene may return fully alive in the next; indeed, in the world of the novel, Donne and his entire ship crew are already dead, or perhaps simply bear the identical names of a previous crew: "their living names matched the names of a famous dead crew that had sunk in the rapids and been drowned to a man" (36).

Critics have described Harris's abstract, experimental narratives as difficult to read, dense, complex, or opaque. Many readers have commented that his essays push the boundaries of traditional literary criticism, and that his fiction pushes the limits of the novel genre itself. Harris's writing has been associated with many different literary genres by critics, including: surrealism, magic realism, mysticism and modernism.  Over the years, Harris has used many different concepts to define his literary approach, including: cross-culturalism, modern allegory, epic, and quantum fiction. One critic described Harris's fictions as informed by "quantum penetration where Existence and non-existence are both real. You can contemplate them as if both are true."

Hena Maes-Jelinek has argued that before 1982, many of Harris' women characters were restricted to muse and mother roles. Joyce Sparer Adler agrees, but notes that certain novels had stronger characters with more narrative agency, such as Beti in The Far Journey of Oudin (1961) and Magda in The Whole Armour (1962). However, it is not until Mary in The Angel at the Gate (1982) that Harris writes a woman protagonist proper. Adler also notes that Carnival (1985) features major woman characters such as Aunt Bartelby and Amaryllis. As such, these two books represent significant developments; Adler points to a more androgynous vision of consciousness portrayed in the two, particularly Carnival (1985). In an interview with Kate Webb, Angela Carter deepens the critical conversation by arguing that all of Harris's characters are archetypal; so any critique about flatness leveled against woman characters would also apply to the men.

In his introduction to Tradition, the Writer, and Society (1967), C. L. R. James writes of a dialectical impulse at work in Harris' fiction and theory, linking Harris to Hegel and Heidegger. However, later critical work such as by Hena Maes-Jelinek, Paget Henry and Andrew Bundy argued that Harris was instead drawing on aesthetic resources of syncretism of African and Amerindigenous systems of belief and practice. Harris himself wrote in History, Fable & Myth in the Caribbean & Guianas (1970) that his work "reads back through the shock of place and time for omens of capacity that were latent, unrealized, within the clash of cultures and movements of peoples into the South Americas and West Indies”. Harris does not necessarily need to rely on a Hegelian historical theory, since he feels that a philosophy of history in fact lies within Caribbean arts (ibid). As much as James' materialist historical approach is an indelible influence on the Caribbean, modern criticism on Harris argues that the importance of the materialist approach cannot overshadow other Caribbean philosophies of history, such as presented by Harris. Paget Henry places Wilson Harris in the "mythopoetic tradition" of Caribbean thought in his foundational Caliban's reason (2000).

Literary technique
The technique of Harris has been called experimental and innovative. Harris describes that conventional writing is different from his style of writing in that "conventional writing is straightforward writing" and "My writing is quantum writing. Do you know of the quantum bullet? The quantum bullet, when it's fired, leaves not one hole but two."

The use of nonlinear events and metaphor is a substantive component of his prose. Another technique employed by Harris is the combination of words and concepts in unexpected, jarring ways, often in the paradoxical yoking of opposites. Through this technique of combination, Harris displays the underlying, linking root that prevents two categories from ever really existing in opposition. The technique exposes and alters the power of language to lock in fixed beliefs and attitudes, "freeing" words and concepts to associate in new ways and revealing the alchemic aspects of consciousness.

Harris sees language as the key to social and human transformations. His approach begins with a regard of language as a power to both enslave and free. This quest and understanding underlies his narrative fiction themes about human slavery. Harris cites language as both, a crucial element in the subjugation of slaves and indentures, and the means by which the destructive processes of history could be reversed.

In Palace of the Peacock, Harris seeks to expose the illusion of opposites that create enmities between people. A crew on a river expedition experiences a series of tragedies that ultimately bring about each member's death. Along the way, Harris highlights as prime factor in their demise their inability to reconcile binarisms in the world around them and between each other. With his technique of binary breakdowns, and echoing the African tradition of death not bringing the end to a soul, Harris demonstrates that they find reconciliation only in physical death, pointing out the superficiality of illusions of opposites that separated them.

Harris noted in an interview that "in describing the world you see, the language evolves and begins to encompass realities that are not visible". Harris attributed his innovative literary techniques as a development that was the result of being witness to the physical world behaving as quantum theory. To accommodate his new perceptions, Harris said he realized he was writing "quantum fiction". The "quantum" component of his work is his attempt to measure up to the demand of reality itself, deeply influenced by his two decades as a land surveyor of the Guyanese interior. Of the connection between nature and his literary style, Harris wrote:

"The table comes from a tree in the forest, the forest is the lungs of the globe, and the lungs of the globe breathe on the stars. There are all sorts of connections and those are quantum connections. Quantum mechanics and physics would embrace those connections. At that stage I had read nothing of quantum mechanics and I simply addressed my repudiation of absolute chains upon nature (my repudiation of a nature there to serve me, to prop up my structures) as an intuitive disturbing necessity. I needed to immerse myself in the living, disturbing, but immensely rich text of landscapes/riverscapes/skyscapes. Language began to break its contract with mere tools framed to enshrine a progressive deprivation. There was a more complex and intuitive approach to language in which one suffers and through which one perceives the peculiar ecstasies of dimensionality." (Harris, "The Fabric of the Imagination" A 72)

His writing has been called ambitiously experimental and his narrative structure is described as "multiple and flexible". Common metafiction framing techniques in his novels include dreams and dreams within dreams (as in the Guyana Quartet (1985) and The Dark Jester (2001)), tropes from epic poetry, found or received archival material (such as the asylum journals analysed by the narrator in The Waiting Room (1966) or The Angel at the Gate(1982), or the papers of Idiot Nameless in Companions of the Day and Night (1975)), and the repeated use of the same characters across different novel-universes (such as the da Silva twins from Palace, who reappear throughout the oeuvre, for example in Da Silva Da Silva's Cultivated Wilderness (1977)).

Harris categorized his innovations and literary techniques as quantum fiction. In a July 2010 interview with Michael Gilkes, he said: "I came to the idea of a quantum reality through the kind of landscape I was dealing with. You had trees, rivers, cliffs, human beings, waterfalls and you had various opposites in them. There were opposites in the land, in the rivers, in the waterfalls, and in order to write about this I had to find a method which I later discovered was a quantum reality. At the time when I wrote Palace I knew nothing of quantum physics. Later on I used the idea consciously, since I had already opened myself to it. It runs through all my novels." He uses the definition in The Carnival Trilogy and in the final novel, The Four Banks of the River of Space.

Death and legacy
Harris died on 8 March 2018, at his home in Chelmsford, England, of natural causes. The centenary of his birth was celebrated by the Bocas Lit Fest.

Works

Novels
(All published by Faber and Faber)

 1960: Palace of the Peacock
 1961: The Far Journey of Oudin
 1962: The Whole Armour
 1963: The Secret Ladder
 1964: Heartland
 1965: The Eye of the Scarecrow
 1966: The Waiting Room
 1967: Tumatumari
 1968: Ascent to Omai
 1969: The Sleepers of Roraima (illustrated by Kay Usborne)
 1971: The Age of the Rainmakers (illustrated by Kay Usborne)
 1972: Black Marsden: A Tabula Rasa Comedy
 1975: Companions of the Day and Night
 1977: Da Silva da Silva's Cultivated Wilderness/Genesis of the Clowns
 1978: The Tree of the Sun
 1982: The Angel at the Gate
 1985: Carnival
 1985: The Guyana Quartet (Palace of the Peacock, The Far Journey of Oudin,The Whole Armour, The Secret Ladder)
 1987: The Infinite Rehearsal
 1990: The Four Banks of the River of Space
 1993: Resurrection at Sorrow Hill
 1993: The Carnival Trilogy (Carnival, The Infinite Rehearsal, The Four Banks of the River of Space), 1993
 1996: Jonestown
 2001: The Dark Jester
 2003: The Mask of the Beggar
 2006: The Ghost of Memory

Short stories
 Kanaima, 1964
 The Sleepers of Roraima, 1970
 The Age of the Rainmakers, 1971

Poetry
 Fetish, 1951
 The Well and the Land, 1952
 Eternity to Season, 1954

Nonfiction
 1967: Tradition, the Writer and Society: Critical Essays. London: New Beacon Books.
 1970: History, Fable and Myth in the Caribbean and Guianas.  Georgetown: National History and Arts Council.
 1974: Fossil and Psyche.  Austin: University of Texas.
 1981: Explorations: A Series of Talks and Articles 1966– 1981. Aarhus: Dangaroo Press.
 1983: The Womb of Space: The Cross-Cultural Imagination. Westport: Greenwood Press.
 1992: The Radical Imagination: Lectures and Talks. Liège: L3.
 1999: The Unfinished Genesis of the Imagination: Selected Essays of Wilson Harris. London: Routledge.

Prizes and awards
1987: Guyana Prize for Literature
1992: Premio Mondello dei Cinque Continenti
2002: Guyana Prize for Literature (Special Award)
2008: The Nicolas Guillen Philosophical Literature Prize, Caribbean Philosophical Association
2014: Anisfield-Wolf Book Award

References

Further reading
Adler, Joyce Sparer. Exploring the Palace of the Peacock: Essays on Wilson Harris. Kingston: University of the West Indies Press, 2003. 
Nathaniel Mackey. Discrepant Engagement. Dissonance, Cross-Culturality, and Experimental Writing. Cambridge: Cambridge University Press, 1993 (Chapters 9–12).
Hena Maes-Jelinek. The Labyrinth of Universality. Wilson Harris's Visionary Art of Fiction (Amsterdam/New York: Rodopi, 2006), 564 pp.
Barbara J. Webb.  Myth and History in Caribbean Fiction: Alejo Carpentier, Wilson Harris, and Edouard Glissant (Amherst: University of Massachusetts Press, 1992).
 Wilson Harris Collection at the Harry Ransom Center at the University of Texas at Austin

External links

 "Wilson Harris", British Council Literature
 Wilson Harris: An Overview.
 The Wilson Harris Bibliography
 Maya Jaggi, "Redemption song" (profile of Wilson Harris), The Guardian, 16 December 2006.
 Caribbean Review of Books page on Harris. An index to material from the CRB archive and elsewhere online.
 Fred D'Aguiar, "Wilson Harris – an Interview", BOMB 82/Winter 2003.
 "The World Today with Tariq Ali - Da Silva, Da Silva: A Tribute to Wilson Harris", 27 March 2018, via YouTube.

1921 births
2018 deaths
Guyanese writers
Fellows of the Royal Society of Literature
Alumni of Queen's College, Guyana
Knights Bachelor
Guyanese novelists
20th-century novelists
Guyanese emigrants to the United Kingdom
Guyanese poets
Guyanese short story writers
People from New Amsterdam, Guyana
20th-century short story writers
20th-century male writers
21st-century male writers
20th-century Guyanese writers
21st-century Guyanese writers